The Hui people are a minority ethnic group in China.

Hui may also refer to:

People
 Emperor Hui of Han, the second emperor of the Han Dynasty
 King Hui of Chu, king of the State of Chu during the Spring and Autumn Period
 King Hui of Wei, a ruler of the state of Wei during the Warring States Period
 King Hui of Zhou, king of the Zhou Dynasty
 Duke Hui of Qi, ruler of the State of Qi during the Spring and Autumn Period
 Duke Hui I of Qin, ruler of the Zhou Dynasty state of Qin from 500 to 492 BC
 Duke Hui II of Qin, ruler of the Zhou Dynasty state of Qin from 399 to 387 BC
 Hui (priestess), ancient Egyptian priestess during the Eighteenth dynasty, mother-in-law of Thutmose III
 Hui of Balhae (died 817), eighth king of Balhae in modern Korea and Manchuria
 Hui (singer), South Korean singer-songwriter
 Chen Xuezhao or Hui (1906–1991), Chinese writer

Other uses
 Health Utilities Index, rating scale used to measure general health status and health-related quality of life
 Hui (informal loan club), a group-based rotating saving and credit scheme
 Hui (Māori assembly), a gathering of New Zealand Māori people
 Hui (secret society), a type of secret brotherhood
 Hui (surname), various Chinese surnames
 Hui dialect or Huizhou Chinese, a subdivision of spoken Chinese
 Hui County (徽县), a country of Gansu province, China
 HUI Gold Index, an American stock market index of gold mining companies
 HUI MIDI mapping protocol, an interface between digital audio workstations and connected hardware controllers
 Huixian (辉县), a county of Henan province, China
 Phu Bai International Airport's IATA code
 Alternate spelling of Hee (Korean name)

See also
 Huy (disambiguation)
 Wang Hui (disambiguation)